Brevundimonas viscosa is a Gram-negative and rod-shaped  bacterium from the genus of Brevundimonas which has been isolated from saline soil from China.

References

External links
Type strain of Brevundimonas viscosa at BacDive -  the Bacterial Diversity Metadatabase

Bacteria described in 2012
Caulobacterales